This page summarizes 2016 in Estonian football.

National teams 

The home team or the team that is designated as the home team is listed in the left column; the away team is in the right column.

Senior

Friendly matches

Baltic Cup 2016

FIFA World Cup 2018 qualifying

Promotion and relegation

Pre-season 

1. Club was relegated to II Liiga
2. Club was dissolved
3. Club emerged with JK Kernu Kadakas

League tables

Meistriliiga

Esiliiga

Esiliiga B

II Liiga

North/East

South/West

III Liiga

North

East

South

West

IV Liiga

North/East

North/West

South

Estonian Cup

Home teams listed on top of bracket. (AET): At Extra Time

Promotion/relegation playoffs

To Meistriliiga

First leg

Second leg

To Esiliiga

First leg

Second leg

To Esiliiga B

First leg

Second leg

First leg

Second leg

To II Liiga

First leg

Second leg

First leg

Second leg

First leg

Second leg

First leg

Second leg

To III Liiga

First leg

Second leg

First leg

Second leg

First leg

Second leg

First leg

Second leg

Statistics

Estonian clubs in international competitions

FC Flora Tallinn

FC Infonet

JK Nõmme Kalju

FC Levadia Tallinn

References

 
Seasons in Estonian football